Sir Robert Stanley  (died 3 June 1632) was an English politician who sat in the House of Commons in 1626.

Stanley was the son of William Stanley, 6th Earl of Derby. He was appointed Knight of the Order of the Bath at the coronation of King Charles I on 2 February 1626. In 1626, he was elected Member of Parliament for Lancashire. He was of Ormskirk, Lancashire and Chelsea, Middlesex.

References

Year of birth missing
1632 deaths
English MPs 1626
Knights of the Bath
Younger sons of earls
Members of the Parliament of England (pre-1707) for Lancashire